Bond Nunatak is a snow-capped nunatak with rock exposures on its west face, rising north of Mount Bouvier on Adelaide Island. It was named by the UK Antarctic Place-Names Committee in 1963 for Flight Lieutenant Peter R. Bond, RAF, pilot with the British Antarctic Survey Aviation Unit based at Adelaide station in 1962–63.

References
 

Nunataks of Graham Land
Landforms of Adelaide Island